Daniel Henninger is a conservative American commentator. He serves as the deputy editorial page director of The Wall Street Journal, and is a Fox News contributor.

Early life
Henninger was born in Cleveland, Ohio. He is a graduate of Georgetown University's Edmund A. Walsh School of Foreign Service.

Career
Henninger serves as the deputy editorial page director of The Wall Street Journal, and is a contributor to Fox News. He also writes a column named "Wonder Land", which appears in the Journal every Thursday. In the 1980s he wrote most of the Journal's editorials on drug regulation. He is a frequent guest on the Saturday Fox News show Journal Editorial Report, in which he discusses current issues with fellow editorial page writers and guests. (A transcript of the discussion appears on OpinionJournal.com the following Monday.)

He won the Gerald Loeb Award for commentary in 1985; the 1995 American Society of Newspaper Editors' Distinguished Writing Award for editorial writing; and the 1997 National Journalism Award for editorial writing. He shared in the staff of The Wall Street Journal's 2002 Pulitzer Prize for Breaking News Reporting on 9/11.

Personal life
Henninger is a onetime resident of Ridgewood, New Jersey.

References

External links 

 Henninger's biography at OpinionJournal.com
 Archive of "Wonder Land" columns
 "Worse Than ObamaCare: Obama's biggest failure is that he hobbled the U.S. economy., "Wonder Land", 11/20/2013
 

Living people
Walsh School of Foreign Service alumni
Writers from Cleveland
The Wall Street Journal people
Journalists from Ohio
Gerald Loeb Award winners for Columns, Commentary, and Editorials
Pulitzer Prize for Breaking News Reporting winners
Year of birth missing (living people)